The 2010 Black-Eyed Susan Stakes was the 86th running of the Black-Eyed Susan Stakes. The race took place in Baltimore, Maryland on May 14, 2010, and was televised in the United States on the Bravo TV network owned by NBC. Ridden by jockey Jose Lezcano, Acting Happy, won the race by one and a half lengths over runner-up No Such Word. Approximate post time on the evening before the Preakness Stakes was 5:50 p.m. Eastern Time and the race was run for a purse of $200,000. The race was run over a fast track in a final time of 1:50.00. The Maryland Jockey Club reported total attendance of 27,609. The attendance at Pimlico Race Course that day was a record crowd for Black-Eyed Susan Stakes Day.

Payout 

The 86th Black-Eyed Susan Stakes Payout Schedule

$2 Exacta:  (4–1) paid   $166.80

$2 Trifecta:  (4–1–6) paid   $640.20

$1 Superfecta:  (4–1–6–5) paid   $1,532.20

The full chart 

 Winning Breeder: Samantha & Mace Siegel; (KY)  
 Final Time: 1:50.00
 Track Condition: Fast
 Total Attendance: 27,609

See also 
 2010 Preakness Stakes
 Black-Eyed Susan Stakes Stakes "top three finishers" and # of starters

References

External links 
 Official Black-Eyed Susan Stakes website
 Official Preakness website

2010 in horse racing
Horse races in Maryland
2010 in American sports
2010 in sports in Maryland
Black-Eyed Susan Stakes